This is the list of cathedrals in Cuba sorted by denomination.

Roman Catholic 
Cathedrals of the Roman Catholic Church in Cuba:
 Cathedral of Our Lady of Candelaria in Camagüey
 Cathedral de San Eugenio de la Palma in Ciego de Avila
 Cathedral of Our Lady of the Immaculate Conception in Cienfuegos
 Cathedral of St. Catherine of Ricci in Guantánamo
 Cathedral of St. Isidore in Holguín
 Cathedral of St. Charles Borromeo in Matanzas
 Catedral de San Rosendo in Pinar del Río
 Cathedral of St. Christopher in Havana
 Cathedral of St. Clare of Assisi in Santa Clara
 Cathedral of Our Lady of the Assumption in Santiago de Cuba
 Catedral Santísimo Salvador de Bayamo in Bayamo

Eastern Orthodox
 Orthodox Cathedral of St. Nikolas of Myra in Havana (Ecumenical Patriarchate)
 Our Lady of Kazan Orthodox Cathedral in Havana (Russian Orthodox)

Anglican
Cathedrals of the Episcopal Church of Cuba:
 Cathedral of the Holy Trinity in Havana

See also
Lists of cathedrals
Christianity in Cuba

References

 01
Cuba
Cathedrals
Cuba
Cathedrals